Killing Kennedy: The End of Camelot is a 2012 non-fiction book by Bill O'Reilly and Martin Dugard about the assassination of the 35th President of the United States John F. Kennedy. It is a follow-up to O'Reilly's 2011 book Killing Lincoln. Killing Kennedy was released on October 2, 2012 through Henry Holt and Company.

Synopsis
In Killing Kennedy the authors narrate the events leading up to the assassination of President Kennedy as well as the event's aftermath. O'Reilly and Dugard also focus on the element of the growing Cold War, Kennedy's attempt to deal with the rise of Communism, and the potential threat from organized crime.

Reception
Critical response to Killing Kennedy was mixed, with The New York Times writing that the book was at times disappointing but that it "picks up strength as it heads for its date with destiny". The book has been criticized for a "lack of citation and occasional 'literary liberties'". For example, in the prologue, the authors write, "Kennedy is the youngest president ever elected. Eisenhower is the oldest." While Kennedy was the youngest president ever elected at the time of his inauguration and remains so today, Dwight D. Eisenhower was not the oldest ever elected even in 1961 at the time of Kennedy's inauguration. William Henry Harrison was the oldest president ever elected as of 1961. However, in 1961 at the end of his term Eisenhower was the oldest president to date, as Harrison died one month into his term at the age of 68 years 54 days. Eisenhower was 70 years 98 days old on the day of Kennedy's inauguration.

O'Reilly has stated that he and Dugard wrote the book to be "fun" and "to get people engaged with their country". The book sold 118,000 copies in its first week.

Another passage where O'Reilly claims he was present outside the Florida home of alleged conspirator George de Mohrenschildt when he committed suicide has been shown by several sources to be false, as he was known not to be in the state at the time. In response, the publisher Henry Holt and Company issued a statement: "This one passage is immaterial to the story being told by this terrific book and we have no plans to look into this matter."

Adaptation

After the success of Killing Lincoln, National Geographic Channel announced it would produce a film adaptation of Killing Kennedy. In May 2013, it was announced that Rob Lowe was to play President John F. Kennedy, Ginnifer Goodwin would play First Lady Jacqueline Kennedy, and Michelle Trachtenberg would portray Lee Harvey Oswald's wife Marina Oswald. The television film premiered on November 10, 2013. On its original airing, it drew in 3,354,000 viewers, averaging a 1.1 rating with adults in the 25-54 demographic. The viewership broke the record previously held by Killing Lincoln which averaged 3,351,000 viewers.

References

External links

Official book website

2012 non-fiction books
Non-fiction books about the assassination of John F. Kennedy
Cultural depictions of Jacqueline Kennedy Onassis
Henry Holt and Company books
Books by Bill O'Reilly (political commentator)
Books by Martin Dugard (author)
Non-fiction books adapted into films